Nigel Ogden (born 1954) is an English theatre organist, known for presenting and performing on the BBC Radio 2 programme The Organist Entertains between 1980 and the end of the show's run in 2018.

Ogden was born in Manchester, England, the son of a church organist, and had several years of piano lessons, before taking up the organ at the age of twelve. As a child, his family took him to Blackpool Tower Ballroom to hear performances on the Wurlitzer organ there, by Reginald Dixon.

He studied to be a teacher, then worked as a sales demonstrator for an organ retail business in Hyde, Cheshire, where he later started his own business selling organs. From 1972, he started appearing on The Organist Entertains, eventually taking over from Robin Richmond as presenter in March 1980.

Ogden is also a composer and a touring musician, playing both theatre and church organs, and was the organist for the Channel 4 production of Dennis Potter's Lipstick on Your Collar.

Ogden was awarded with a British Academy of Songwriters, Composers and Authors Gold Badge of merit on 17 October 2012.

He has released a number of CDs.

After the final episode of The Organist Entertains was broadcast in 2018, Ogden began to present regularly on The Organist Encores podcast.

References

External links 

 Nigel Ogden's Organ Collection - some of the organs played by Ogden during The Organist Entertains
 Ogden's touring schedule at OrganRecitals.com

English organists
British male organists
Theatre organists
Musicians from Manchester
BBC Radio 2 presenters
English composers
English radio presenters
1954 births
Living people